The University of Chicago Crime Lab is a research center at the University of Chicago dedicated to studying crime and developing and evaluating crime-reduction programs. One of the University of Chicago's multiple Urban Labs, the Crime Lab was founded in 2008, and its current director is Jens Ludwig. Much of its funding has come from the MacArthur Foundation.

In May 2022, The University of Chicago announced a $27.5 million donation from Kenneth Grifin and Michael Sacks to launch an initiative design to train police managers and prevent neighbourhood violence. The funds will aid in launching two community Safety Leadership Academies. The Policing Management Academy aims to professionalize departments by educating their leaders though coaching, accountability and data-driven decision making. This donation came after Griffins $10 million donation to the Crime Lab in 2018 to implement an early intervention system to investigate citizens complains.

References

External links

2008 establishments in Illinois
Research institutes established in 2008
Research institutes of the University of Chicago